This article contains a list of towns in Chile.

A town is defined by Chile's National Statistics Institute (INE) as an urban entity possessing between 2,001 and 5,000 inhabitants—or between 1,001 and 2,000 inhabitants if 50% or more of its population is economically active in secondary and/or tertiary activities. This list is based on a June 2005 report by the INE based on the 2002 census, which registered 274 towns across the country, however only 269 of them are shown here. (Note: The higher number is based on the number given in the regional summary provided by the INE report. The lower number is based on a manual count of the report. The discrepancies are found in the Valparaíso Region (report: 31 / manual count: 28), the O'Higgins Region (report: 39 / manual count: 38) and the Los Ríos and Los Lagos Region combined (report: 31 / manual count: 30).)

List of towns by region (269)

Arica and Parinacota Region (1)
Putre

Tarapacá Region (3)

Pica
Collaguasi
La Tirana

Antofagasta Region (4)

Cerro Moreno
Juan López
Hornitos
San Pedro de Atacama

Atacama Region (7)

Bahía Inglesa
Loreto
Puerto Viejo
El Salado
Flamenco
Portal del Inca
Freirina

Coquimbo Region (14)

Las Tacas
Tongoy
Guanaqueros
Puerto Velero
La Higuera
Canela Baja
Pichidangui
Quilimarí Alto
Chillepín
Guamalata
La Chimba
Sotaquí
Chañaral Alto
Punitaqui

Valparaíso Region (28)

Laguna Verde
Quintay
San Juan Bautista
Maitencillo
Puchuncaví
Hanga Roa
San Rafael
Placilla
Valle Hermoso
Los Quinquelles
Pichicuy
Los Molles
Artificio
Papudo
Pullalli
Chincolco
Petorca
Zapallar
La Laguna de Zapallar
Catapilco
San Pedro
El Yeco
Mirasol
Las Brisas
Algarrobal-Punta El Olivo
Curimón
Panquehue
El Llano

O'Higgins Region (38)

La Compañía
Coinco
Coltauco
Loreto-Molino
Parral de Purén
El Manzano
Sewell
Coya
Pelequén
Malloa
Angostura
La Punta
Olivar Alto
Pichidegua
Rosario
Esmeralda
Los Lirios
El Tambo
Rastrojos
Cáhuil
La Estrella
Costa de Sol
Litueche
Marchihue
La Boca
La Vega de Pupuya
Paredones
Bucalemu
Angostura
Chépica
Auquinco
Tinguiririca
San Enrique de Romeral
Lolol
Cunaco
Peralillo
Población
Placilla

Maule Region (35)

Panguilemo
Huilquilemu
Santa Olga
Los Pellines
Curepto
Empedrado
Maule
Chacarillas
Pelarco
Pencahue
Cumpeo
San Rafael
Chanco
Pelluhue
Quilicura
Sarmiento
Villa Los Niches
San Alberto
Licantén
Iloca
Itahue Uno
Rauco
Romeral
Sagrada Familia
Villa Prat
Lago Vichuquén
Llico
Vara Gruesa
Las Obras
Colbún
Panimávida
Retiro
Copihue
Bobadilla
Yerbas Buenas

Biobío Region (46)

Florida
Monte Aguila
Talcamávida
Caleta Tumbes
Dichato
Rafael
Santa Rosa
Laraquete
Ramadilla
Carampangue
Contulmo
Antiguala
Tirúa
San Carlos de Purén
Millantú
Santa Fé
Villa Génesis
Antuco
Negrete
Coihue
Quilaco
Quilleco
Las Canteras
Villa Mercedes
Tucapel
Estación Yumbel
Ralco
Quinchamalí
Santa Clara
Cobquecura
El Carmen
Ninhue
San Gregorio
Pemuco
Pinto
Recinto-Los Lleuques
Portezuelo
Villa Las Mercedes
Ñipas
Villa Illinois
Cachapoal
San Fabián de Alico
San Ignacio
Pueblo Seco
San Nicolás
Puente Ñuble
Treguaco
Campanario

Araucanía Region (31)

Trovolhue
Los Laureles
Curarrehue
Quepe
Galvarino
Lastarria
Pillanlelbún
Huiscapi
Melipeuco
Perquenco
Playa Negra
Puerto Saavedra
Barros Arana
Teodoro Schmidt
Gualpín
Nueva Toltén
Queule
Vilcún
Cherquenco
Cajón
Licán Ray
Ñancul
Cholchol

Ercilla
Pailahueque
Lonquimay
Los Sauces
Lumaco
Capitán Pastene
Tijeral

Los Ríos Region (11)

Niebla
Corral
Llifén
Nontuela
Lago Ranco
Malalhue
Máfil
Mehuín
Coñaripe
Liquiñe
Neltume

Los Lagos Region (19)

Alerce
Los Pellines
Maullín
Carelmapu
Nueva Braunau
Chonchi
Dalcahue
Queilén
Quemchi
Achao
Puerto Octay
Las Cascadas
Corte Alto
Entre Lagos
Bahía Mansa-Muicolpue
San Pablo
Chaitén
Futaleufú
Río Negro

Aisén Region (6)

Villa Mañiguales
Puerto Chacabuco
Puerto Cisnes
Melinka
Cochrane
Chile Chico

Magallanes Region (2)

Puerto Williams
Porvenir

Santiago Metropolitan Region (24)

El Colorado
La Parva
El Maitén
El Principal
San Alfonso
El Ingenio
Santa Marta de Liray
Chicureo
Las Canteras
Estación Colina
Santa Sara
Huertos Familiares
Lo Herrera
El Rulo
Valdivia de Paine
Viluco
San Ignacio
Huelquén
Pintué-La Guachera
Champa
Bollenar
Pomaire
Villa Alhué
María Pinto

See also
 List of cities in Chile
 List of towns

References

External links
National Statistics Institute (INE)

 Towns in Chile
Towns
Chile